The men's BMX racing competition at the 2016 Olympic Games in Rio de Janeiro took place at the Olympic BMX Centre, on 17–19 August.

The medals were presented by Camiel Eurlings, IOC member, Netherlands and Artur Lopes, Member of the UCI Management Committee.

Schedule 
All times are Brasília Time (UTC-03:00)

Results
Q - qualified for the next round; DNF - did not finish

Seeding run

Quarter-finals

Heat 1

Heat 2

Heat 3

Heat 4

Semi-finals

Heat 1

Heat 2

Final

References

Men's BMX
BMX at the Summer Olympics
2016 in BMX
Men's events at the 2016 Summer Olympics